Coptocycla is a tortoise beetle genus in the subfamily Cassidinae.

Species
These 58 species belong to the genus Coptocycla:

 Coptocycla adamantina (Germar, 1824) i c g
 Coptocycla aerata (Boheman, 1855) i c g
 Coptocycla apicata Spaeth, 1936 i c g
 Coptocycla arcuata (Swederus, 1787) i c g
 Coptocycla atriceps (Boheman, 1855) i c g
 Coptocycla auricoma Boheman, 1855 i c g
 Coptocycla aurifera Boheman, 1855 i c g
 Coptocycla bahiana Boheman, 1855 i c g
 Coptocycla bicolon (Germar, 1824) i c g
 Coptocycla bicurvata Boheman, 1855 i c g
 Coptocycla bidivisa Boheman, 1862 i c g
 Coptocycla bisbipustulata Boheman, 1855 i c g
 Coptocycla circumspicua (Boheman, 1855) i c g
 Coptocycla concolor Boheman, 1855 i c g
 Coptocycla conspicillata Boheman, 1855 i c g
 Coptocycla constellata Boheman, 1855 i c g
 Coptocycla contemta (Boheman, 1855) i c g
 Coptocycla cruciata Linnaeus, 1767 g
 Coptocycla decussata Boheman, 1855 i c g
 Coptocycla dentata (Blake, 1965) i c g
 Coptocycla dolosa Boheman, 1855 i c g
 Coptocycla dorsoplagiata Champion, 1894 i c g
 Coptocycla dorsopunctata (Klug, 1829) i c g
 Coptocycla elegans Boheman, 1855 i c g
 Coptocycla excelsa Boheman, 1855 i c g
 Coptocycla exsanguis Boheman, 1855 i c g
 Coptocycla fastidiosa Boheman, 1855 i c g
 Coptocycla febricitans Spaeth, 1936 i c g
 Coptocycla flavovittata Boheman, 1855 i c g
 Coptocycla ganglbaueri (Spaeth, 1909) i c
 Coptocycla infans Spaeth, 1937 i c g
 Coptocycla jamaicana Spaeth, 1936 i c g
 Coptocycla laeta Boheman, 1855 i c g
 Coptocycla laqueata Spaeth, 1936 i c g
 Coptocycla leprosa (Boheman, 1855) i c g
 Coptocycla lunifera Boheman, 1855 i c g
 Coptocycla marmorata Champion, 1894 i c g
 Coptocycla mundula Boheman, 1862 i c g
 Coptocycla orbiculata Champion, 1894 i c g
 Coptocycla paranensis Spaeth, 1936 i c g
 Coptocycla placida Boheman, 1855 i c g
 Coptocycla quadrinotata Boheman, 1855 i c g
 Coptocycla robusta Spaeth, 1936 i c g
 Coptocycla roseocincta Boheman, 1855 i c g
 Coptocycla ruficornis Spaeth, 1936 i c g
 Coptocycla rufonotata Champion, 1894 i c g
 Coptocycla sagana Boheman, 1862 i c g
 Coptocycla sordida Boheman, 1855 i c g
 Coptocycla stigma (Germar, 1824) i c g
 Coptocycla strandi Spaeth, 1936 i c g
 Coptocycla subovata Spaeth, 1937 i c g
 Coptocycla subpunctata Spaeth, 1937 i c g
 Coptocycla texana (Schaeffer, 1933) i c g b (anacua tortoise beetle)
 Coptocycla undecimpunctata (Fabricius, 1781) i c g
 Coptocycla usta Boheman, 1855 i c g
 Coptocycla vana Boheman, 1855 i c g
 Coptocycla virguncula Boheman, 1862 i c g
 Coptocycla vittipennis Boheman, 1855 i c g

Data sources: i = ITIS, c = Catalogue of Life, g = GBIF, b = Bugguide.net

References

External links 

 

Chrysomelidae genera
Cassidinae
Taxa named by Louis Alexandre Auguste Chevrolat